Tsenov  is a Bulgarian surname. Notable people with the surname include:

 Marin Tsenov, Bulgarian football midfielder
 Mitko Tsenov, Bulgarian middle-distance runner
 Bratan Tsenov, Bulgarian wrestler
 Gancho Tsenov, Bulgarian scholar and professor

Bulgarian-language surnames